The 2023 Oklahoma State Cowboys football team will represent Oklahoma State University as a member of the  Big 12 Conference during the 2023 NCAA Division I FBS football season. They are expected to be led by Mike Gundy in his 19th year as their head coach.

The Cowboys play their home games at Boone Pickens Stadium in Stillwater, Oklahoma.

Schedule

References

Oklahoma State
Oklahoma State Cowboys football seasons
Oklahoma State Cowboys football